Stella is a 1921 British silent drama film directed by Edwin J. Collins and starring Molly Adair, H. Manning Haynes and Charles Vane. It is based on the 1904 novel Stella Fregelius by H. Rider Haggard.

Cast
 Molly Adair as Stella Fregelius 
 H. Manning Haynes as Maurice Cook 
 Charles Vane as Colonel Monk 
 Betty Farquhar as Mary Porson 
 Wilfred Fletcher as Stephen Lanyard 
 Mildred Evelyn as Eliza Lanyard

References

Bibliography
 Low, Rachael. History of the British Film, 1918-1929. George Allen & Unwin, 1971.

External links

1921 films
1921 drama films
British silent feature films
British drama films
Films directed by Edwin J. Collins
Butcher's Film Service films
Films based on works by H. Rider Haggard
1920s English-language films
1920s British films
Silent drama films